Giovanni De Min may refer to:
Giovanni De Min (painter) (1786–1859), Italian painter and engraver
Giovanni De Min (footballer) (born 1940), retired Italian footballer